Tamar Hovhannesi Tumanyan (1907–1989) was a Soviet Armenian architect. She was awarded the title, Honored Worker of Culture of the Armenian SSR (1977). Her father was poet and writer Hovhannes Tumanyan.

Biography 
Tamar Tumanyan was born in 1907 in Tbilisi, Russian Empire to parents  and the noted poet Hovhannes Tumanyan. She was the youngest of 10 children in her family. Her siblings included Musegh (1889–1938), Ashkhen (1891–1968), Nvard (1892–1957), Artavazd (1894–1918), Hamlik (1896–1937), Anush (1898–1927), Arpik (1899–1981), Areg (1900–1939), and Seda (1905–1988).

She attended Yerevan Polytechnic Institute (now the National Polytechnic University of Armenia); followed by study at the National University of Architecture and Construction of Armenia.

Starting in 1933, she worked as an architect in Alexander Tamanian's studio in Yerevan. It was at Tamanian's studio where she participated in the design of the Yerevan Opera Theatre (1939), and the Government House, Yerevan (1941). She later worked as an architect in Mark Grigorian's studio.

From 1945 to 1949 she was the secretary of the Union of Architects of Armenia. From 1947 to 1951 she was the chairman of the board of the Armenian Architectural Fund.

Works 
 Residential building of Kanaker HPP, Yerevan
 Residential building of factory #447, Yerevan
 Factory dormitory #447, Yerevan
 Building of the Meteorological Department, Yerevan
 Hotel in Sisian
 Yerevan Opera Theatre
 Government House, Yerevan

See also 

 Anna Ter-Avetikian
 Lori Province, area where her father's family had originated

References 

1907 births
1989 deaths
Armenian architects
People from Tbilisi
People from Yerevan
National Polytechnic University of Armenia alumni
20th-century Armenian architects
Soviet architects
Russian people of Armenian descent
Women architects